Marta Flores (1913–2005) was a Spanish actress who appeared in more than ninety productions during her lengthy career. During the 1930s and 1940s Flores was a leading lady in films like Romeo and Juliet She later switched to playing smaller character roles.

Selected filmography

 Los héroes del barrio (1937)
 Usted tiene ojos de mujer fatal (1939)
 Romeo and Juliet (1940)
 El 13.000 (1941)
 El sobre lacrado (1941) - Romualda
 Goyescas (1942) - Pepa, La Gitana
 Melodías prohibidas (1942)
 Cuando pasa el amor (1943)
 Piruetas juveniles (1944) - Angela, la madre di Stella
 Cero en conducta (1945)
 Se le fue el novio (1945) - Isabel
 La hija del circo (1945)
 Ramsa (1946)
 El castillo de Rochal (1946)
 Alma baturra (1948)
 La casa de las sonrisas (1948) - Susana
 Don Juan de Serrallonga (1949) - Amiga de Juana en baile
 Life in Shadows (1949) - Esposa
 ¿Milagro en la ciudad? (1957)
 La muralla (1958) - amiga de Matilde
 La tirana (1958) - Marquesa
 Un vaso de whisky (1959) - Extranjera
 Miss Cuplé (1959) - Amalia Escuder
 Sangue na Arena (1959) - Monja
 El emigrante (1960) - Marquesa
 El amor empieza en sábado (1961) - Florette
 No dispares contra mí (1961) - Madame de la fiesta
 La mentira tiene cabellos rojos (1962) - Invitada de la fiesta
 That Man in Istanbul (1965) - Lady in Casino
 El hijo de Gabino Barrera (1965)
 Tumba para un forajido (1965) - Madre de Frank
 El terrible de Chicago (1967) - Mrs. Brown
 La 'mini' tía (1968) - Madre del niño
 Elisabet (1968)
 Turistas y bribones (1969) - Marquesa
 El señorito y las seductoras (1969) - Madre en gasolinera
 Veinte pasos para la muerte (1970) - Sra. Fox
 ¿Quién soy yo? (1970) - Mujer del prefecto
 Investigación criminal (1970)
 Rain for a Dusty Summer (1971) - Margarita
 Una cuerda al amanecer (1972)
 Horror Story (1972) - Comisaria
 La otra imagen (1973)
 Aborto criminal (1973)
 Los Kalatrava contra el imperio del karate (1974) - Secretaria de rodaje
 Emma, puertas oscuras (1974) - Srta. Evans
 Chicas de alquiler (1974) - Jefa de la agencia
 Larga noche de julio (1974) - Empleada de la taquilla
 La dynamite est bonne à boire (1974)
 El último proceso en París (1974) - Portera
 El asesino de muñecas (1975) - Invitada de la fiesta
 Yo fui el rey (1975) - Dueña de la casa
 Guapa, rica y... especial (1976) - Señora 1ª
 Long Vacations of 36 (1976) - Mujer
 La nueva Marilyn (1976) - Mujer que ayuda a Teresa
 La ciutat cremada (1976)
 La perversa caricia de Satán (1976) - 1st Lady Guest
 Vivir a mil (1976) - Dueña casa de citas
 Una prima en la bañera (1976)
 Sexy... amor y fantasía (1977) - María
 Las alegres chicas de 'El Molino''' (1977) - Tía de Christa
 Fraude matrimonial (1977) - Luisa (uncredited)
 El despertar de los sentidos (1977)
 Perros callejeros (1977) - Familiar de Isabel
 La viuda andaluza (1977)
 Borrasca (1978) - Esposa del alcalde
 Óscar, Kina y el láser (1978) - Pueblerina
 Cuarenta años sin sexo (1979) - Mujer de Agapito (uncredited)
 Companys, procés a Catalunya (1979) - Senyora Cua
 Sensitività (1979) - Marta - Lillian's aunt
 Los bingueros (1979) - Mujer velatorio 2 (uncredited)
 La verdad sobre el caso Savolta (1980) - Vecina (uncredited)
 Viaje al más allá (1980) - Sor Clara
 Neumonía erótica y pasota (1981) - Pitonisa
 Barcelona sur (1981)
 Una rosa al viento (1984) - Cocinera
 Yo, 'El Vaquilla' (1985) - Monja
 El lío de papá (1985) - Ramona
 La joven y la tentación (1986)
 Crónica sentimental en rojo (1986) - Dueña del bar
 Mordiendo la vida (1986) - La Trueno
 Andalucía chica (1988)
 El aire de un crimen (1988) - Dueña de la pensión
 Cásate conmigo, Maribel (2002) - Dña. Mercedes (final film role)

 References 

 Bibliography 
 Davies, Anthony & Wells, Stanley. Shakespeare and the Moving Image: The Plays on Film and Television''. Cambridge University Press, 1994.

External links 
 

1913 births
2005 deaths
Spanish film actresses
Actresses from Madrid